Johnjo Kenny (born 9 February 1961 in Kinross, Scotland) is a Scottish-Irish curler and curling coach.

Teams

Men's

Mixed

Record as a coach of national teams

References

External links

Living people
1961 births
Sportspeople from Perth and Kinross
Irish male curlers
Irish curling coaches
Scottish male curlers